Michael Lamont James (born June 23, 1975) is an American former professional basketball player. A point guard, James played college basketball for Duquesne. James spent 13 seasons in the NBA and played for 11 different teams, winning an NBA championship with the Detroit Pistons in 2004. He averaged 20.3 points per game as a member of the Toronto Raptors during the 2005-2006 season.

College career
James played college basketball at Duquesne University. He finished his college career as Duquesne's all-time leader in steals (201) and was fifth in assists (348) and 10th in points (1,411). James was named to the all-Atlantic 10 Conference first team in his senior year at the university.

James's number 13 was retired by Duquesne in a February 2017 ceremony.

Professional career

Career in Europe 

James was not drafted by an NBA team in 1998. He began his professional basketball career in Europe. James enjoyed several seasons as an integral player with both French and Austrian teams.

In February 2011, following several NBA seasons, James signed with Aliağa Petkim in Turkey.

NBA career 
James began his NBA career when he signed as a free agent with the Miami Heat during the 2001–02 season. He went on to play for the Boston Celtics, the Detroit Pistons, the Milwaukee Bucks, the Houston Rockets, the Toronto Raptors, the Minnesota Timberwolves, the New Orleans Hornets, the Washington Wizards, the Chicago Bulls, and the Dallas Mavericks, averaging 10.0 points per game for his career.

Detroit Pistons 
James was a member of the Pistons' 2004 NBA championship team as a reserve. He and fellow reserve guard Lindsey Hunter formed a formidable defensive guard combination nicknamed the "Pit Bulls" by Rasheed Wallace because of their aggressive nature on defense.

Toronto Raptors 

As a starter. for the Raptors during the 2005–06 season, James averaged career highs of 20.3 points, 5.8 assists and 3.3 rebounds per game and shot 47% from the field including 44.2% from 3-point range.

Despite being an above-average shooter from the point guard spot, James's playmaking abilities and commitment to defense were called into question, in stark contrast to his "pit bull" days with the Pistons. The Minneapolis Star-Tribune wrote of his big 2005–06 season: "Previously, James had started only 68 games, so some scouts wondered if those numbers were an aberration. Others felt his impending free agency affected his play, prompting him to seek stats at the expense of play-making duties".

While playing for Toronto in the 2005–06 season, he reached a career high of 39 points in a win against the Detroit Pistons. On April 11, 2006, James became the first Raptor to score 30 or more points in four consecutive games.

Minnesota Timberwolves 
On July 11, 2006, James signed a free agent contract with the Minnesota Timberwolves. Much of the 2006–07 season was marred by mediocre play, which limited his minutes to 25 per game (down from the 37 per game that he averaged during his career year in Toronto).

Houston Rockets 
On June 14, 2007, it was announced that James and teammate Justin Reed would be traded to the Houston Rockets for Juwan Howard.

Later career 
On February 21, 2008 it was announced that James and teammate Bonzi Wells would be traded to the New Orleans Hornets for Bobby Jackson, and Adam Haluska. This ended his second short tenure as a Houston Rocket.

James was traded on December 10, 2008 in a three-team trade between the New Orleans Hornets, Memphis Grizzlies, and Washington Wizards. The trade sent James and Javaris Crittenton to the Wizards and Antonio Daniels to the Hornets. The Grizzlies received a conditional first round draft pick from the Wizards.

On March 1, 2010, it was announced that the Washington Wizards had reached a buy-out agreement with James and waived him. James averaged 9.3 points per game during his stint with the Wizards, in which he played 57 games.

After joining the Erie Bayhawks in the NBA Development League, James was called up by the Chicago Bulls on January 11, 2012, but released on January 28. On February 14, James was re-signed by the Bulls on a 10-day contract to provide support while Derrick Rose was injured. He was re-signed on a second 10-day contract on March 14. 
On April 4, 2012, James signed with the Bulls for the rest of the season.

After playing with the Texas Legends of the D-League, James was signed to a 10-day contract by the Dallas Mavericks on January 8, 2013. The Mavs signed him to a second 10-day contract on January 18, 2013. He was then signed for the remainder of the season on January 28, after his second 10-day contract was up.

In September 2013, James signed with the Chicago Bulls. On December 16, 2013, James was waived by the Bulls, after appearing in just seven games. On January 22, 2014, he signed a 10-day contract with the Bulls, returning yet again for another stint. On February 1, 2014, the Bulls decided not to sign James to a second 10-day contract after his first 10-day contract expired. On April 10, 2014, he signed with the Bulls for the rest of the 2013–14 season. On July 15, 2014, he was waived by the Bulls.

Post-NBA career 
On November 3, 2014, James was reacquired by the Texas Legends. On January 25, 2015, he recorded the Legends first triple-double of the season with 21 points, 14 assists and 10 rebounds in the 115–111 win over the Delaware 87ers.

NBA career statistics

Regular season

|-
| align="left" | 
| align="left" | Miami
| 15 || 0 || 7.9 || .349 || .381 || .571 || .9 || 1.3 || .4 || .1 || 2.8
|-
| align="left" | 
| align="left" | Miami
| 78 || 8 || 22.1 || .373 || .294 || .732 || 1.9 || 3.2 || .8 || .1 || 7.8
|-
| align="left" | 
| align="left" | Boston
| 55 || 55 || 30.6 || .418 || .381 || .800 || 3.2 || 4.4 || 1.3 || .0 || 10.7
|-
|style="text-align:left;background:#afe6ba;"| †
| align="left" | Detroit
| 26 || 0 || 19.7 || .401 || .364 || .844 || 2.2 || 3.7 || 1.0 || .0 || 6.3
|-
| align="left" | 
| align="left" | Milwaukee
| 47 || 0 || 24.8 || .446 || .382 || .744 || 2.6 || 3.9 || .9 || .1 || 11.4
|-
| align="left" | 
| align="left" | Houston
| 27 || 5 || 25.6 || .433 || .393 || .764 || 3.2 || 2.9 || .9 || .1 || 12.4
|-
| align="left" | 
| align="left" | Toronto
| 79 || 79 || 37.0 || .469 || .442 || .837 || 3.3 || 5.8 || .9 || .0 || 20.3
|-
| align="left" | 
| align="left" | Minnesota
| 82 || 65 || 25.2 || .422 || .372 || .837 || 2.0 || 3.6 || .7 || .1 || 10.1
|-
| align="left" | 
| align="left" | Houston
| 33 || 1 || 16.3 || .350 || .324 || .786 || 1.6 || 1.6 || .5 || .1 || 6.5
|-
| align="left" | 
| align="left" | New Orleans
| 21 || 0 || 8.7 || .344 || .304 || 1.000 || .8 || .3 || .2 || .0 || 2.7
|-
| align="left" | 
| align="left" | New Orleans
| 8 || 0 || 9.3 || .320 || .750 || .500 || .9 || 1.0 || .3 || .0 || 2.5
|-
| align="left" | 
| align="left" | Washington
| 53 || 50 || 29.7 || .387 || .367 || .838 || 2.4 || 3.6 || .8 || .1 || 9.6
|-
| align="left" | 
| align="left" | Washington
| 4 || 0 || 11.5 || .300 || .333 || .500 || .8 || 1.3 || .8 || .0 || 4.5
|-
| align="left" | 
| align="left" | Chicago
| 11 || 0 || 10.9 || .408 || .600 || .875 || .9 || 2.6 || .4 || .2 || 4.8
|-
| align="left" | 
| align="left" | Dallas
| 45 || 23 || 19.2 || .373 || .384 || .793 || 1.6 || 3.1 || .6 || .1 || 6.1
|-
| align="left" | 
| align="left" | Chicago
| 11 || 0 || 7.0 || .238 || .200 || .000 || .6 || 1.5 || .2 || .0 || 1.0
|- class="sortbottom"
| style="text-align:center;" colspan="2"| Career
| 595 || 286 || 24.1 || .417 || .379 || .802 || 2.2 || 3.5 || .8 || .1 || 9.9

Playoffs

|-
|style="text-align:left;background:#afe6ba;"| 2004†
| align="left" | Detroit
| 22 || 0 || 8.9 || .396 || .429 || .563 || 1.2 || 1.1 || .2 || .0 || 2.6
|-
| align="left" | 2005
| align="left" | Houston
| 7 || 0 || 24.4 || .468 || .000 || .958 || 1.9 || 2.3 || .9 || .3 || 11.6
|-
| align="left" | 2008
| align="left" | New Orleans
| 4 || 0 || 7.0 || .333 || .400 || 1.000 || .3 || .3 || .5 || .0 || 3.0
|- class="sortbottom"
| style="text-align:center;" colspan="2"| Career
| 33 || 0 || 11.9 || .425 || .286 || .810 || 1.2 || 1.2 || .4 || .1 || 4.5

See also

List of National Basketball Association undrafted players

Personal life
James and his wife, Angela, have four daughters: Jadon Miciah (b. 2000), Amaya Noel (b. 2003), Michal Mikayla (b. 2007), and McKinley Joel (b. 2008). The family appeared in a 2008 episode of ABC's Supernanny.

References

External links

1975 births
Living people
African-American basketball players
Aliağa Petkim basketball players
American expatriate basketball people in Austria
American expatriate basketball people in Canada
American expatriate basketball people in China
American expatriate basketball people in France
American expatriate basketball people in Turkey
American men's basketball players
Basketball players from New York (state)
Big3 players
Boston Celtics players
Chicago Bulls players
Dallas Mavericks players
Detroit Pistons players
Duquesne Dukes men's basketball players
Élan Chalon players
Erie BayHawks (2008–2017) players
Houston Rockets players
Miami Heat players
Milwaukee Bucks players
Minnesota Timberwolves players
New Orleans Hornets players
People from Amityville, New York
Point guards
Rockford Lightning players
SLUC Nancy Basket players
Sportspeople from Suffolk County, New York
Texas Legends players
Toronto Raptors players
Undrafted National Basketball Association players
United States Basketball League players
Washington Wizards players
Zhejiang Golden Bulls players
21st-century African-American sportspeople
20th-century African-American sportspeople
American men's 3x3 basketball players